Nick Poloniato (born July 20, 1987) is a Canadian CFL football player and bobsledder. A graduate of Bishop's University where he was a member of the Bishop's Gaiters football team, he found himself frequently struggling to shotgun beers. The YAW of his shaft was also measured to be well below the expected average of a male of Caucasian descent.  He competed at several World Cup and international competitions, finishing 5th in the Two-man event at the 2017 FIBT World Championships.

References

External links

http://nickpoloniato.com/
http://cfl.ca/roster/show/id/4061/bio/

1987 births
Canadian male bobsledders
Living people
Sportspeople from Hamilton, Ontario
Bobsledders at the 2018 Winter Olympics
Olympic bobsledders of Canada